Beverly Marie Rodriguez De Leon (born 23 August 1994 in Ponce, Puerto Rico) is a Puerto Rican model and beauty pageant titleholder who was crowned Miss International Puerto Rico 2017.

Early life
Beverly was born and raised in Ponce, Puerto Rico and graduated at Pontificia Universidad Catolica de Puerto Rico of Certified Public Accountant.

Pageantry

Miss International Puerto Rico 2017
Beverly was crowned Miss International Puerto Rico 2017 and she will represent Puerto Rico at this year's Miss International 2017 Pageant in Japan.

Miss International 2017
Beverly withdrew from representing Puerto Rico at Miss International 2017, because of the hurricanes that affected the island.

Summary

References

External links
Official website

1994 births
Living people
Beauty pageants in Puerto Rico
People from Ponce, Puerto Rico
Pontifical Catholic University of Puerto Rico alumni